The Maryland Terrapins baseball team is the varsity intercollegiate baseball program of University of Maryland, College Park in College Park, Maryland, United States. The program's first season was in 1893, and it has been a member of the NCAA Division I Big Ten Conference since the start of the 2015 season. Its home venue is Shipley Field at Bob "Turtle" Smith Stadium, located on Maryland's campus. Rob Vaughn is the team's head coach starting in the 2018 season. The program has appeared in six NCAA Tournaments. It has won zero conference tournament championships and five regular season conference titles. As of the start of the 2021 Major League Baseball season, 38 former Terrapins have appeared in Major League Baseball.

History 
During the 2014 and 2015 seasons, Maryland made consecutive conference tournament championship game appearances and posted back-to-back campaigns of 40 or more wins, a first in school history. The Terps have made multiple appearances in various top-25 national college baseball polls in each of the last two seasons and was voted the 2015 preseason favorite to win the Big Ten Conference title, its first season competing in the league. After failing to make the NCAA tournament for 43 years, the Terrapins earned berths in the 2014 and 2015 NCAA Division I Baseball Tournaments. In 2014, Maryland Baseball beat South Carolina to advance to the NCAA tournament Super Regional round for the first time in school history. Maryland has participated in eight NCAA tournaments: 1965, 1970, 1971, 2014, 2015, 2017, 2021, and 2022. The program has won five conference championships in its history.

Facilities

Shipley Field at Bob "Turtle" Smith Stadium (1952–present) 

Shipley Field at Bob "Turtle" Smith Stadium, often referred to simply as Shipley Field, has been the home of the Maryland baseball team for more than 60 years. The team's playing field was moved to its current location in 1952, and became Shipley Field in 1956. The ballpark is located right in the heart of the Maryland campus, in between Byrd Stadium and the Artificial Turf Facility. The facility's current seating capacity is 2,500. Its playing surface is Sportexe Synthetic Turf in the infield and Bermuda Grass in the outfield and the dimensions are 320 down the left field line, 380 to center and 325 down the right field line.

In 1982, Shipley Field was the site of an exhibition game between the Terps and Earl Weaver's Baltimore Orioles. Eight years later, in 1990, the Soviet baseball team paid a visit to Shipley Field to take on the Terps in an exhibition series. The stadium has been hosting night games since a set of permanent lights were installed prior to the 1994 season. Shipley Field is named after legendary Terps' coach H. Burton Shipley, who was the Maryland skipper from 1924-1960.

On May 8, 2010, Shipley Field was officially dedicated as Shipley Field at Bob "Turtle" Smith Stadium in honor of former Maryland baseball player, Bob "Turtle" Smith '63. Bob and his wife Carol had previously established a fully endowed baseball scholarship, called the "Bob "Turtle" Smith & Carol B. Smith and Family Endowed Baseball Scholarship" A new turf infield, an upgraded warning track, a new brick backstop, a new outfield fence and an upgraded scoreboard were installed prior to the 2011 season.

Eric Milton Family Clubhouse
Prior to the start of Maryland's game against the Miami Hurricanes on Saturday, April 13, 2013 head coach John Szefc and the Terrapin baseball program held a dedication ceremony to unveil the Eric Milton Family Clubhouse.

The Terps' clubhouse, which is located within the Varsity Team House just beyond the left-field fence at Shipley Field at Bob "Turtle" Smith Stadium, received a facelift with significant help from former Terrapin Eric Milton (1994–96) and his family.

The renovation included the installation of 38 custom cherry-wood lockers, new carpeting and flooring, new signage, and the addition of an awards wall and a custom counter for kitchen appliances.

"This project is really important for the program because it was an area in which we were lacking," said Szefc. "Eric's generosity and timeliness allowed us to do it now and let the three seniors (Jack Cleary, Jordan Hagel and Jimmy Reed) benefit from it."

"Eric's generosity was big in getting it done now, instead of in six months. With his history in the program as a player and a coach, it adds that much more having his name on it. He, more than anyone, understands how important a legitimate clubhouse can be to a player. It certainly helps our guys day-to-day as far as their quality of life with how much time they spend in there. It adds a lot more coming from him. Eric is near and dear to our program as a player and coach."

The Shell
In 2011, a 5,000 square foot hitting and pitching facility, nicknamed, "The Shell," was installed behind the left-field fence at Shipley Field at Bob "Turtle" Smith Stadium and adjacent to the Varsity Team House.

Notable alumni

 Bosey Berger
 Tom Bradley
 Tom Brown 
 Brett Cecil
 Mark Ciardi
 Bob Ferris
 Kevin Hart
 Buck Herzog
 Gene Hiser
 Vic Keen
 Charlie Keller
 Hal Keller
 Mike Knode
 Justin Maxwell
 Eric Milton
 Simon Nicholls
 Jim Norris
 Sherry Robertson
 Jeff Schaefer
 Steve Schmoll
 Ron Swoboda

Current MLB roster
Former Terrapins on current MLB rosters.

Individual honors

All-Americans

Conference Honors

ACC Player of the Year

All-ACC

Big Ten Freshman of the Year

NCAA Tournament Record

See also
List of NCAA Division I baseball programs

References

Maryland Baseball, Year-By-Year Record

External links
Maryland Baseball on UMTerps.com
Maryland Terrapins Career Batting Records
Maryland Terrapins Career Pitching Records